is a city in Fukuoka Prefecture on the island of Kyūshū, Japan. , the city has an estimated population of 112,052 and a population density of 1,376 persons per km2. The total area is 81.45 km2.

The mayor is Michio Koga.

Education
Kyushu Teikyo Junior College

Geography
Ōmuta is located in the southernmost end of Fukuoka Prefecture, is bordered by the Ariake Sea in the west, and meets Kumamoto prefecture to the south and east.

It contains Yamagi and Miike mountains, and the rivers Omuta, Suwa, Doumen and Kumagawa.

Ōmuta's zoo is home to lesser pandas.

Climate

History
The oldest reference to Ōmuta, precisely Kunugi, one of the neighborhoods in the current Ōmuta city, is found in Nihonshoki (720), the chapter of Emperor Keikō, whose historical existence is doubtful.

In the late 12th century, three ponds were formed, supposedly as a result of volcanic activity. Miike, a neighborhood in Ōmuta, is named after those three ponds (jp: "三池 mi-ike").

In 1469, a farmer named Denzaemon eventually found coal in the mountains when he made a bonfire. Coal mining would become the main industry in this area.

During the Edo period, Ōmuta was a part of the Miike han (Miike Domain), ruled by the Tachibana clan who also ruled Yanagawa. In 1721, Ono Harunobu, karō (steward) of Yanagawa han (Yanagawa Domain) was granted Hirano Takatori yama, and started to mine coal. During the 1850s another two coal mines were opened.

In 1871, in a course of the Meiji restoration, the Han system was abolished and prefectures were founded. Ōmuta belonged to the Miike (1871), Mizuma (1871–1876) and finally Fukuoka prefectures (1876–present) respectively.

The Ōmuta and Miike townships, which would form the core of the current city, were founded on April 1, 1889, a consequence of the town and village administrative system, in Miike county, Fukuoka. The Meiji government ran coal mining in Miike at first themselves, but soon sold it to a private company for a very low price, compared to its value, which caused a scandal.

On March 1, 1917, Ōmuta received city status. Ōmuta had developed as an industrial city, centered on the Miike coal mine, which existed from the 1860s until 1997. In 1891, a railway began to operate, connecting Ōmuta with Fukuoka. It is still operated today as the  Kagoshima Main Line. In 1902, Miike Port opened on Ariake Bay. New coal mines were opened, and Ōmuta became an industrial center in this region. 1908 Miike Port was opened to foreigners and in the next year the Trade Taxation Office was established along the port, as a branch of the Nagasaki Trade Taxation Office.

While miners enjoyed good wages, their working conditions were not very good, like many other Japanese laborers. In 1918 and 1924, big strikes and other protests arose. Through many protests and other activities, in the 1930s we found many of the strikers' wishes granted: women,  prisoners, and horses were no longer found in mines, and miners were hired directly by the company.

In 1921 and 1941, mergers with neighboring towns and villages, including Ōmuta, occurred, and in 1941 the city became as large as it is now. The 1941 merger was a side effect of World War II: the government led mergers in many places, thinking it would make municipal  administration more efficient. During the war, Ōmuta  was bombed in 1944 and 1945, not only in industrial areas, but also downtown. The prisoner-of-war camp "Fukuoka 17", where allied prisoners were forced to work in the mines, was located in the outskirts of the city.

In 1959, Ōmuta recorded its largest population: 208,877.  But Japanese industries began to switch from coal to oil. Coal mining became less profitable, and many mines were closed, but Miike remained one of the biggest coal mines in Japan until its closure in 1997. Many people left the city, since they couldn't find work. This had a major effect on the local economy: many downtown shops closed.

In 1960, the Japanese media observed the Miike dispute which was linked with the reform of the Treaty of Mutual Cooperation and Security between Japan and the United States of America.

Industry
For the majority of its past in the modern age, Omuta was a coal mining town. However, with the recent closure of the Miike mine, industry has focused elsewhere.

Thanks to coal mining, chemical industry was developed. Currently, there is movement in the environmental recycling industry, centered on the generation of electricity from waste products.

Another main industry is aluminium refining.

Commercial fishing continues out of the port, Kurosaki.

Crime and safety
The Kyushu Seido-kai designated yakuza syndicate is headquartered in Omuta.

Transport

Airport
Saga and Kumamoto Airports are close, but a great many more passengers transit to or from Omuta through Fukuoka Airport due to its greater number of connecting flights and additional services.

Rail
The city is serviced by JR Kyushu's Kagoshima Main Line for national intercity rail services which connects the city with Fukuoka, Kurume,  Kumamoto or Kagoshima directly. Nishi-Nippon Railroad runs the Tenjin Omuta Line, a commuter line connecting Omuta to Fukuoka in just over an hour (limited stop), or longer (with all 49 intermediate stops).

Stations
There are two main Omuta train stations. Both the Kagoshima Main Line and the Tenjin Omuta Line stop at Ōmuta Station. However, the new Kyūshū Shinkansen line stops at Shin-Ōmuta Station.

Bus
General Shuttle and High-Speed buses are provided to nearby cities and airports by Nishi-Nippon Railroad.

Road
Ōmuta is serviced by two Japanese national highways (208 & 389).

Shipping
Docks at Port Miike are the main way to approach the city by sea.

Sister cities
  Datong (northern Shanxi Province, China
  Muskegon, Michigan, United States of America

References

Further reading
 Gilman, Theodore J. No Miracles Here: Fighting Urban Decline in Japan and the United States. State University of New York Press, 2001 - Compares and contrasts the decline of Omuta with that of Flint, Michigan.

External links

 Ōmuta City official website 
 Ōmuta City official website 
 "Omuta: The shopping arcades of a thousand bankruptcies"

 
Cities in Fukuoka Prefecture
Populated places established in 1917
Port settlements in Japan
Populated coastal places in Japan